Standing In My Shoes is an album by American guitarist Leo Kottke, released in 1997. It is an eclectic mix of traditional and contemporary music which surprised a few of Kottke's long-time fans.

Kottke's cover version of Fleetwood Mac's "World Turning" appeared on "The Drew Carey Show". Chet Atkins guests on lead guitar on "Twice".

Reception

Writing for Allmusic, music critic Stephen Erlewine wrote of the album "... Kottke comes up with one of his most unusual records with Standing in My Shoes... His solos are loose and swinging, and even his trio of vocal numbers have a charming, carefree quality. Standing in My Shoes does bog down occasionally, particularly when the execution is more compelling than the material, but on the whole, it is one of his more fascinating records of the '90s. In his review for Salon.com, critic Gary Kamiya wrote: "Like a ragtime pianist, he has the kind of impeccable ability to play different lines simultaneously that almost requires a split brain. The man's right hand should be preserved for science... It's all very solid and unobjectionable, though a bit short on the sublime moments that Kottke at his best can attain...  "Standing In My Shoes" isn't groundbreaking, but it's a pleasant excursion into new territory for a first-rate instrumentalist."

Track listing
All songs by Leo Kottke except as noted.
 "Standing in My Shoes" (Leo Kottke, Denny Bruce)
 "World Turning" (Lindsey Buckingham)
 "Dead End"
 "Vaseline Machine Gun"
 "Corrina, Corrina" (Traditional)
 "Realm"
 "Cripple Creek" (Traditional)
 "Twice"
 "Across the Street"
 "Don't Call Me Ray" (Leo Kottke, Steve Wariner)
 "Itchy"

Personnel
Leo Kottke - 6 & 12-string guitar, sitar, vocals
David Smith - bass
Greg Morrow - drums and percussion
Reese Wynans - organ
Kim Parent - background vocals
Chet Atkins - lead guitar on "Twice"
David Z - drum programming, sitar, celeste

Production notes
Produced and engineered by David Z
Assistant engineers: Sandy Jenkins, Amy Hughes, Rich Cohen
Edited by Frank Green
Mastered by George Marino

References

External links
 Leo Kottke official site
 Unofficial Leo Kottke web site (fan site)

1997 albums
Leo Kottke albums
Private Music albums